Antonio Calderón (died 1654) was a Roman Catholic prelate who was appointed as Archbishop-elect of Granada (1654).

On 12 January 1654, Antonio Calderón was appointed during the papacy of Pope Innocent X as Archbishop of Granada. He died before he was consecrated bishop on 12 Jul 1654.

References

External links and additional sources
 (for Chronology of Bishops) 
 (for Chronology of Bishops) 

17th-century Roman Catholic bishops in Spain
Bishops appointed by Pope Innocent X
1654 deaths
Archbishops of Granada